The 1912 Fordham Maroon football team was an American football team that represented Fordham University as an independent during the 1912 college football season. In its first year under head coach Tom Thorp, Fordham claims a 17–5 record. College Football Data Warehouse (CFDW) lists the team's record at 4–4.

Schedule
The following eight games are reported in Fordham's media guide, CFDW, and contemporaneous press coverage.

The following are 14 additional games reported in the Fordham media guide.

References

Fordham
Fordham Rams football seasons
Fordham Maroon football